Inter Fútbol Sala, known as Inter Movistar Fútbol Sala for sponsorship reasons, is a professional futsal club based in Torrejón de Ardoz, Madrid. The club was founded in 1977 and its pavilion is the Pabellón Jorge Garbajosa with capacity of 3,136 seated spectators. The club's main sponsors is Movistar.

History
Inter FS was founded in 1977 as Hora XXV. The team played charity matches with players like Amancio, Adelardo and López Ufarte. In 1979, the team played its first futsal championship as Interviú Hora XVV. In the following years, Inter won several league titles and cups.

In 1989 the Spanish Football Federation and the Association of Soccer unified their championships, creating the LNFS. Inter was one of its founding members, and in the inaugural season, Inter won the league and cup double. Two years later, Inter won the Futsal European Clubs Championship. In the following years the club maintained a good level, but the tough competition did not let them win the league again until 1996.

From 2002 until 2005, Inter won four consecutive league titles and became one of the dominant clubs in the national championship. In recognition, the Government of Spain granted the institution Plate Gold Royal Order of Sports Merit in 2006.

Inter won five league titles in a row starting in the 2013–14 season, for its thirteenth league title overall in the 2017–18 season. Inter also won the UEFA Futsal Cup in 2018, for its fifth title overall.

Locations
During its entire history, Inter FS played in several locations in the Community of Madrid.
1977–1991: Pabellón Antonio Magariños (Madrid)
1991–1996: Polideportivo Municipal (Alcobendas)
1996–2004: Pabellón Parque Corredor (Torrejón de Ardoz)
2004–2015: Pabellón Fundación Montemadrid (Alcalá de Henares)
2015–present: Pabellón Jorge Garbajosa (Torrejón de Ardoz)

Club names
 1977–1979: Hora XXV
 1979–1981: Interviú Hora XXV
 1981–1991: Interviú Lloyd's
 1991–1996: Interviú Boomerang
 1996–1999: Boomerang Interviú
 1999–2000: Airtel Boomerang
 2000–2002: Antena3 Boomerang
 2002–2007: Boomerang Interviú
 2007–2008: Interviú Fadesa
 2008–present: Inter Movistar

Current squad

Season to season

31 seasons in Primera División

European competitions record

Last update: 23 November 2014

Club Honours

National competitions
Primera División: 14 (1989–90, 1990–91, 1995–96, 2001–02, 2002–03, 2003–04, 2004–05, 2007–08, 2013–14, 2014–15, 2015–16, 2016–17, 2017–18, 2019–20)
Copa de España (LNFS): 11 (1989–90, 1995–96, 2000–01, 2003–04, 2004–05, 2006–07, 2008–09, 2013–14, 2015–16, 2016–17, 2020-21)
Copa del Rey: 2 (2014–15, 2020–21)
Supercopa de España: 14 (1990, 1991, 1996, 2001, 2002, 2003, 2005, 2007, 2008, 2011, 2015, 2017, 2018, 2020)
Liga FEFS: 9 (1979–80, 1980–81, 1981–82, 1983–84, 1984–85, 1985–86, 1986–87, 1987–88, 1988–89)
Copa de España (FEFS): 3 (1983–84, 1985–86, 1987–88)
Campeonato de Clubs de España: 3 (1979–80, 1980–81, 1981–82)

European competitions
UEFA Futsal Champions League: 5 (2003–04, 2005–06, 2008–09, 2016–17, 2017–18)
European Champions Cup: 1 (1990–91)
European Cup Winners' Cup: 1 (2007–08)
Iberian Cup: 2 (2004, 2006)

International competitions
Intercontinental Cup: 5 (2005, 2006, 2007, 2008, 2011)

Regional competitions
Campeonato de Madrid: 8 (1993–94, 1994–95, 1998–99, 1999–00, 2000–01, 2005–06, 2007–08, 2009–10)

References

External links
Official website
Profile at LNFS.es

 
Futsal clubs in Spain
Sports teams in the Community of Madrid
Futsal clubs established in 1977
1977 establishments in Spain
Sport in Torrejón de Ardoz